Billie Jean King defeated Rosemary Casals in the final, 6–4, 7–6(5–2) to win the women's singles tennis title at the 1971 US Open.

Margaret Court was the two-time reigning champion, but did not defend her title.

This tournament marked the first major in which future world No. 1 and 18-time major champion Chris Evert competed in the main draw; she lost to King in the semifinals. Evert competed in 19 consecutive US Opens until her retirement in 1989, and failed to reach the semifinals only twice in that span.

Seeds
The seeded players are listed below. Billie Jean King is the champion; others show the round in which they were eliminated.

 Billie Jean King (champion)
 Rosemary Casals (Runner-up)
 Virginia Wade (withdrew before the tournament began)
 Kerry Melville (semifinalist)
 Françoise Dürr (third round)
 Judy Tegart-Dalton (quarterfinalist)
 Nancy Richey (third round)
 Julie Heldman (third round)

Draw

Key
 Q = Qualifier
 WC = Wild card
 LL = Lucky loser
 r = Retired

Final eight

Earlier rounds

Section 1

Section 2

Section 3

Section 4

External links
1971 US Open – Women's draws and results at the International Tennis Federation

Women's Singles
US Open (tennis) by year – Women's singles
1971 in women's tennis
1971 in American women's sports